LLaMA (Large Language Model Meta AI) is a large language model (LLM) released by Meta AI in February 2023. A variety of model sizes were trained ranging from 7 billion to 65 billion parameters. LLaMA's developers reported that the 13 billion parameter model's performance on most NLP benchmarks exceeded that of the much larger GPT-3 (with 175 billion parameters) and that the largest model was competitive with state of the art models such as PaLM and Chinchilla. Whereas the most powerful LLMs have generally been accessible only through limited APIs (if at all), Meta released LLaMA's model weights to the research community under a noncommercial license. Within a week of LLaMA's release, its weights were leaked to the public via BitTorrent.

Architecture and training

LLaMA uses the transformer architecture, the standard architecture for language modelling since 2018. LLaMA's developers focused their effort on scaling the model's performance by increasing the volume of training data, rather than the number of parameters, reasoning that the dominating cost for LLMs is from doing inference on the trained model rather than the computational cost of the training process. LLaMA was trained on 1.4 trillion tokens, drawn from publicly available data sources, including:
 Webpages scraped by CommonCrawl
 Open source repositories of source code from GitHub
 Wikipedia in 20 different languages
 Public domain books from Project Gutenberg
 The LaTeX source code for scientific papers uploaded to ArXiv
 Questions and answers from Stack Exchange websites

Release and leak
LLaMA was announced on February 23, 2023, via a blog post and a paper describing the model's training, architecture, and performance. The code used to train the model was publicly released under the open-source GPL 3 license. Access to the model's weights was managed by an application process, with access to be granted "on a case-by-case basis to academic researchers; those affiliated with organizations in government, civil society, and academia; and industry research laboratories around the world".

On March 2, 2023, a torrent containing LLaMA's weights was uploaded, with a link to the torrent shared on the 4chan imageboard and subsequently spreading through online AI communities. That same day, a pull request on the main LLaMA repository was opened, requesting to add the magnet link to the official documentation. On March 4, a pull request was opened to add links to HuggingFace repositories containing the model. On March 6, Meta filed takedown requests to remove the HuggingFace repositories linked in the pull request, characterizing it as "unauthorized distribution" of the model. HuggingFace complied with the requests. As of March 17, Facebook has not responded to the pull request containing the magnet link. 

Reactions to the leak varied. Some speculated that the model would be used for malicious purposes, such as more sophisticated spam. Some have celebrated the model's accessibility, as well as the fact that smaller versions of the model can be run relatively cheaply, suggesting that this will promote the flourishing of additional research developments. Multiple commentators, such as Simon Willison, compared LLaMA to Stable Diffusion, a text-to-image model which, unlike comparably sophisticated models which preceded it, was openly distributed, leading to a rapid proliferation of associated tools, techniques, and software.

Applications
The Stanford University Institute for Human-Centered Artificial Intelligence (HAI) Center for Research on Foundation Models (CRFM) released Alpaca, a training recipe based on the LLaMA 7B model that uses the "Self-Instruct" method of instruction tuning acquire capabilities comparable to the OpenAI GPT-3.5 series text-davinci-003 model at a modest cost.

References

Large language models
Internet leaks